Sulaymani Peshmarga Sport Club is a sports club based in Sulaymaniyah, Iraqi Kurdistan. They currently play in the Kurdistan Premier League and  Iraq Division One. The club was founded in 1999.

Rivalries

Peshmerga fans consider their main rivals to be Sulaymaniya.

Current squad

Club honours

Iraq Division One: 1
2009–10
Kurdish Cup: 1
2012–13

External links
 http://www.goalzz.com/main.aspx?team=7048

1999 establishments in Iraq
Football clubs in Sulaymaniyah
Sulaymaniyah